Francis Bugbee (February 18, 1794 – April 21, 1877) was an American lawyer, judge, and politician.

Bugbee was born in Ashford, Conn., February 18, 1794, the son of Amos and Martha (Woodward) Bugbee.  He graduated from Yale College in 1818.  After graduation, he took charge of an academy in North Carolina, at the same time studying law with Judge Badger. In June 1820, he was admitted to the bar in that State, and in the October following to the bar of Pennsylvania at Harrisburg.

In January 1821, he settled in Elyton, Jefferson County, Alabama, where he remained until 1826, at which time he removed to Montgomery, in the same state, where he resided till his death. Besides pursuing the regular duties of his profession, he was a warm friend of education, and served from 1836 to 1871 as a trustee of the University of Alabama.

In 1843 he was a member of the Alabama State Legislature.  During the American Civil War he was an avowed Union man, and at its close was appointed a judge of the circuit court, in which relation he gave eminent satisfaction. From 1866 to 1869 he served as United States Attorney. He died suddenly at his residence in Montgomery, April 21, 1877, of apoplexy, in the 84th year of his age.

Judge Bugbee was married, in Jefferson County, Alabama, July 5, 1827, to Lavinia H. Tarrant, by whom he had five children, of whom two daughters, with their mother, survived him. His only son, a graduate of the University of Alabama, and a lawyer of high promise, died in 1859.

External links

Francis Bugbee Papers, University Libraries Division of Special Collections, The University of Alabama

1794 births
1877 deaths
People from Ashford, Connecticut
North Carolina lawyers
Pennsylvania lawyers
Alabama lawyers
University of Alabama people
Members of the Alabama Legislature
United States Attorneys for the District of Alabama
Yale College alumni
19th-century American politicians
19th-century American lawyers